Portraits for NHS Heroes is an art project held in the United Kingdom during the COVID-19 pandemic.

Artist Thomas Croft, at a loss as to what to paint during lockdown, put out an offer on Instagram on 4 April 2020, saying he would paint a free portrait for the first National Health Service (NHS) worker to reply:

This led to him painting a portrait in oils of Manchester Royal Infirmary Accident & Emergency nurse Harriet Durkin, wearing PPE, including a 3M face mask, a Guardian visor, gloves and a gown. He gave the painting to her.

However, Croft received so many requests that he eventually put 500 NHS workers in touch with professional artists, who volunteered to paint them.

To showcase some of the artwork - including Croft's portrait of Harriet Durkin - a virtual exhibition was created in May 2020 by The Net Gallery, a London-based arts platform that uses 3D technology to turn exhibitions into virtual walkthroughs. The Net Gallery installed fine art prints by fifteen artists at Fitzrovia Chapel and then scanned the work to create a virtual walkthrough. The entire process was completed in a single day, following strict government social distancing guidelines, and was organised in support of NHS Charities Together. All the artists featured in the exhibition, including Croft, are members of the  Contemporary British Portrait Painters (CBPP).

In August 2020, Croft partnered with Paintings in Hospitals and Google Arts & Culture to presents Healthcare Heroes, an online exhibition of over 700 painted portraits submitted through the #portraitsforNHSheroes initiative. 

It is planned to have an exhibition of many of the portraits once the pandemic subsides.

The idea has also been adopted in other countries, including Belgium, Ireland, the Netherlands, Spain, and the United States.

Publication

References

External links 
 
  Net Gallery exhibition

April 2020 events in the United Kingdom
Media depictions of the COVID-19 pandemic in the United Kingdom
National Health Service
Instagram